The Island Within (Azerbaijani: Daxildəki Ada) is a 2020 Azerbaijani comedy-drama film written and directed by Ru Hasanov. Prize 2021 of the international jury at the Festival Nouvelles Images Persanes in Vitré (France), it was selected as the Azerbaijani entry for the Best International Feature Film at the 94th Academy Awards.

Cast
 Orkhan Ata as Seymour Tahirbekov
 Vidadi Gasanov as Khanlar Tahirbekov
 Rafiq Azimov as Grandfather
 Elshan Jabrayilov as Minister of Sports

See also
 List of submissions to the 94th Academy Awards for Best International Feature Film
 List of Azerbaijani submissions for the Academy Award for Best International Feature Film

References

External links
 

2020 films
2020 comedy-drama films
Azerbaijani comedy-drama films
Azerbaijani-language films